Pentagonia gomez-loritoi is a "palmoid" or "Corner Model Tree" of the Costa Rican and Panamanian rainforest belonging to the family Rubiaceae.  It is usually single-trunked (but occasionally branching low into several reiterations ) up to 19.5 feet (six meters) in height.  It is most noteworthy  fo its  pairs of  huge, entire margined, shiny oblanceolate leaves; each leaf up to 4ft.7in. (140 centimeters) in length by up to 22 inches (56 cm ) in width. petiole very short or none. The pairs of leaves are spaced several inches apart along the stem. This species was totally unknown prior to 2014.

The plant was described in 2015 by Barry Edward Hammel as a part of the work  Phytoneuron. The type specimen was collected near Oeste de Volio in Costa Rica by J. Gómez-Laurito & G. Vargas in 1990.

References

Trees of Costa Rica
Plants described in 2015
Trees of Panama
gomez-lauritoi